Audrius Rubežius (born 29 June 1966) is a Lithuanian tenor working with the Lithuanian National Opera and Ballet Theatre. He studied at Stasys Šimkus Conservatory in Klaipėda and Lithuanian Academy of Music in Vilnius. In 1996, he won the Beatričė Grincevičiūtė and Kazimieras Banaitis vocalists' contests. For performance of Belmonte's role in Mozart's Die Entführung aus dem Serail Rubežius received Kristoforas award from the Lithuanian Theatre and Cinema Association.

References

1966 births
Living people
Lithuanian opera singers
Operatic tenors
Lithuanian Academy of Music and Theatre alumni
20th-century Lithuanian male singers
21st-century Lithuanian male singers
20th-century male opera singers
21st-century male  opera singers